Advanced Level (A-Level) Mathematics is a qualification of further education taken in the United Kingdom (and occasionally other countries as well). In the UK, A-Level exams are traditionally taken by 17-18 year-olds after a two-year course at a sixth form or college. Advanced Level Further Mathematics is often taken by students who wish to study a mathematics-based degree at university, or related degree courses such as physics or computer science.
 
Like other A-level subjects, mathematics has been assessed in a modular system since the introduction of Curriculum 2000, whereby each candidate must take six modules, with the best achieved score in each of these modules (after any retake) contributing to the final grade. Most students will complete three modules in one year, which will create an AS-level qualification in their own right and will complete the A-level course the following year—with three more modules.

The system in which mathematics is assessed is changing for students starting courses in 2017 (as part of the A-level reforms first introduced in 2015), where the reformed specifications have reverted to a linear structure—with exams taken only at the end of the course in a single sitting. 

In addition, while schools could choose freely between taking Statistics, Mechanics or Discrete Mathematics (also known as Decision Mathematics) modules with the ability to specialise in one branch of applied Mathematics in the older modular specification, in the new specifications, both Mechanics and Statistics were made compulsory, with Discrete Mathematics being made exclusive as an option to students pursuing a Further Mathematics course. The first assessment opportunity for the new specification is 2018 and 2019 for A-levels in Mathematics and Further Mathematics, respectively.

2000s specification 
Prior to the 2017 reform, the basic A-Level course consisted of six modules, four pure modules (C1, C2, C3, and C4) and two applied modules in Statistics, Mechanics and/or Decision Mathematics. The C1 through C4 modules are referred to by A-level textbooks as "Core" modules, encompassing the major topics of mathematics such as logarithms, differentiation/integration and geometric/arithmetic progressions. 

The two chosen modules for the final two parts of the A-Level are determined either by a student's personal choices, or the course choice of their school/college, though it commonly took the form of S1 (Statistics) and M1 (Mechanics).

Further mathematics

Students that were studying for (or had completed) an A-level in Mathematics had the opportunity to study an A-level in Further Mathematics, which required taking a further 6 modules to give a second qualification. The grades of the two A-levels will be independent of each other,  with Further Mathematics requiring students to take a minimum of two Further Pure modules, one of which must be FP1, and the other either FP2 or FP3, which are simply extensions of the four Core modules from the normal Maths A-Level. Four more modules need to be taken; those available vary with different specifications.

Not all schools are able to offer Further Mathematics, due to a low student number (meaning that the course is not financially viable) or a lack of suitably experienced teachers. To fulfil the demand, extra tutoring is available, with providers such as the Further Mathematics Support Programme.

Some students had the opportunity to take a third maths qualification, "Additional Further Mathematics", which added more modules from those not used for Mathematics or Further Mathematics. Schools that offer this qualification usually only took this to AS-level, taking three modules, although some students went further, taking the extra six modules to gain another full A-Level qualification. Additional Further Mathematics is offered by Edexcel only, and a Pure Mathematics A-level is available for students who—on the Edexcel exam board—take the modules C1, C2, C3, C4, FP1 and either FP2 or FP3. No comparable qualification has been available since the 2017 reforms.

Results and statistics
Each module carried a maximum of 100 UMS points towards the total grade, and each module is also given a separate grade depending on its score. The number of points required for different grades were defined as follows:

The proportion of candidates acquiring these grades in 2007 are below:

Mathematics

Further mathematics

2017 specification
A new specification was introduced in 2017 for first examination in summer 2019. Under this specification, there are three papers which must all be taken in the same year. There are three overarching themes - “Argument, language and proof”, “Problem solving” and “Modelling” throughout the assessment.

Each board structures the three papers as follows:

AQA 
Paper 1: Pure Mathematics
Paper 2: Content on Paper 1 plus Mechanics
Paper 3: Content on Paper 1 plus Statistics

Edexcel 
Paper 1: Pure Mathematics 1
Paper 2: Pure Mathematics 2
Paper 3: Statistics and Mechanics

OCR 
Paper 1: Pure Mathematics
Paper 2: Pure Mathematics and Statistics
Paper 3: Pure Mathematics and Mechanics

Grading

It was suggested by the Department for Education that the high proportion of candidates who obtain grade A makes it difficult for universities to distinguish between the most able candidates. As a result, the 2010 exam session introduced the grade A*—which serves to distinguish between the better candidates.

Prior to the 2017 reforms, the A* grade in maths was awarded to candidates who achieve an A (480/600) in their overall A Level, as well as achieving a combined score of 180/200 in modules Core 3 and Core 4. For the reformed specification, the A* is given by a more traditional grade boundary based on the raw mark achieved by the candidate over their papers.

The A* grade in further maths was awarded slightly differently. The same minimum score of 480/600 was required across all six modules. However, a 90% average (or a score of 270/300) had to be obtained across the candidate's best 'A2' modules. A2 modules included any modules other than those with a '1' (FP1, S1, M1 and D1 are not A2 modules, whereas FP2, FP3, FP4 (from AQA only), S2, S3, S4, M2, M3 and D2 are).

See also
A-level
Additional Mathematics
Further Mathematics

References

External links 

 Underground Mathematics (Resources on A-level mathematics)

Education in the United Kingdom
Mathematics education in the United Kingdom
Vocational education